The 1995 Bowling Green Falcons football team was an American football team that represented Bowling Green University in the Mid-American Conference (MAC) during the 1995 NCAA Division I-A football season. In their fifth season under head coach Gary Blackney, the Falcons compiled a 5–6 record (3–5 against MAC opponents), finished in sixth place in the MAC, and were outscored by all opponents by a combined total of 228 to 226.

The team's statistical leaders included Ryan Henry with 938 passing yards, Keylan Cates with 866 rushing yards, and Eric Starks with 433 receiving yards.

Schedule

References

Bowling Green
Bowling Green Falcons football seasons
Bowling Green Falcons football